Miles City could refer to some places in the United States:

 Miles City, Florida
 Miles City, Montana
 Miles City Municipal Airport in Miles City, Montana